Aksakovo is a rural locality (a selo) and the administrative centre of Aksakovsky Selsoviet, Belebeyevsky District, Bashkortostan, Russia. The population was 3,131 as of 2010. There are 39 streets.

Geography 
Aksakovo is located 11 km south of Belebey (the district's administrative centre) by road. Nadezhdino is the nearest rural locality.

References 

Rural localities in Belebeyevsky District
Ufa Governorate